Ricardo Arguello was a Mexican sprinter. He competed in the men's 400 metres at the 1932 Summer Olympics.

References

External links

Year of birth missing
Year of death missing
Athletes (track and field) at the 1932 Summer Olympics
Mexican male sprinters
Olympic athletes of Mexico
Place of birth missing
20th-century Mexican people